Pardoprunox (INN) (code name SLV-308) is an antiparkinsonian drug developed by Solvay for the treatment of Parkinson's disease that reached phase III clinical trials before being discontinued. It was also being investigated for the treatment of depression and anxiety but these indications appear to have been abandoned as well.

Pardoprunox acts as a D2 (pKi = 8.1) and D3 receptor (pKi = 8.6) partial agonist (IA = 50% and 67%, respectively) and 5-HT1A receptor (pKi = 8.5) full agonist (IA = 100%). It also binds to D4 (pKi = 7.8), α1-adrenergic (pKi = 7.8), α2-adrenergic (pKi = 7.4), and 5-HT7 receptors (pKi = 7.2) with lower affinity. Relative to other dopaminergic antiparkinsonian agents, pardoprunox is thought to have significantly less of a propensity for inducing certain side effects like dyskinesia and psychosis.

See also
 Aripiprazole
 Bifeprunox

References

Further reading
 
 

5-HT1A agonists
Abandoned drugs
Alpha-1 blockers
Alpha-2 blockers
Benzoxazoles
Carbamates
D2-receptor agonists
D3 receptor agonists
Lactams
Lactones
Phenylpiperazines